Livadica is a village near Podujevo, Kosovo.

It was the site of the Podujevo bus bombing in 2001.

Notes

References 

Villages in Podujevo